Still Climbing may refer to:

Still Climbing (Brownstone album), a 1997 album by Brownstone
Still Climbing (Cinderella album), a 1994 album by Cinderella
Still Climbing (Leslie West album), a 2013 album by Leslie West, a founding member of American rock band Mountain